The Russian Red Cross Society is a volunteer-led, humanitarian organization that provides emergency assistance, disaster relief and education in Russia. It is the designated national affiliate of the International Federation of Red Cross and Red Crescent Societies.

It is now particularly concerned with problems relating to undocumented migrants, and, with the help of the international federation, provides food parcels and support to people who are detained.

It was established by the order of Emperor Alexander II.  Grand Duchess, Elizaveta Fedorovna was responsible for the organisation in Moscow.

There were 109 Red Cross schools of nursing in Russia in 1914. 25000 Sisters of Mercy were trained between 1914 and 1916. The society ran short courses for nurses and sanitary workers in Moscow in 1919 and provided support for mentally ill soldiers.

Controversies 
In October 2022, during the Russian invasion of Ukraine, the Russian Red Cross reduced government costs of the invasion by raising money to help support Russian soldiers fighting in Ukraine and their families. In November, Ukraine’s Parliamentary Commissioner for Human Rights accused the Russia Red Cross of stealing ten premises, office equipment, and vehicles in Russian-occupied Crimea from the Ukrainian Red Cross.

See also
Pyatigorsk Colony of the Russian Red Cross Society

References

Red Cross and Red Crescent national societies
Medical and health organizations based in Russia
1867 establishments in the Russian Empire